Operation Murder is a 1957 British crime film. It was described by Allmovie as "another of the multitude of inexpensive Danzinger Brothers productions, released throughout the English-speaking world by United Artists."

Premise
A scheme by two doctors to establish an alibi for a killing by switching roles in the operating theatre is foiled by the insight of a detective and the chance action of a small boy.

Cast
Dr. Wayne -	Tom Conway
Dr. Bowen -	Patrick Holt
Pat Wayne -	Sandra Dorne
Inspector Price -	John Stone
Julie -	Virginia Keiley
Head Nurse -	Rosamund John
Sgt. Vine -	Frank Hawkins
Larry Vinton -	Robert Ayres
Garage Attendant -	Gilbert Winfield
Harry Bright -	Timothy Fitzgerald
Williams -	Alastair Hunter

References

External links

1957 films
British crime films
Television shows shot at New Elstree Studios
1950s English-language films
Films directed by Ernest Morris
1950s British films